Second Life is an online virtual community.

Second Life may also refer to:

Music
"Second Life", a 2013 song by Kitty
"Second Life", a 2019 song by Seventeen from the album An Ode
"Second Life", a 2010 song by Zach Hill from the album Face Tat

Other uses
Second Life (film), a 2009 Portuguese film
Second Life (TV series), a 2015 television series
Second Life (novel), a 2015 novel by S. J. Watson

See also